Mountain View Airport  is a public airport located one mile (2 km) southwest of the central business district of Mountain View, a city in Howell County, Missouri, United States. It is owned by the City of Mountain View.

Although most U.S. airports use the same three-letter location identifier for the FAA and IATA, Mountain View Airport is assigned MNF by the FAA but has no designation from the IATA (which assigned MNF to the airport on Mana Island in Fiji).

Facilities and aircraft 
For the 12-month period ending August 31, 2005, the airport had 7,330 aircraft operations, an average of 20 per day: 97% general aviation, 3% air taxi and <1% military.

References

External links 

Airports in Missouri
Buildings and structures in Howell County, Missouri